The government of the City and County of San Francisco utilizes the "strong mayor" form of mayoral/council government, composed of the Mayor, Board of Supervisors, several elected officers, and numerous other entities. It is the only consolidated city-county in California, and one of only thirteen charter counties of California. The fiscal year 2019–20 city and county budget was approximately $12.3 billion.

Organization

San Francisco utilizes the "strong mayor" form of mayoral/council government, composed of the mayor, Board of Supervisors, several elected officers, and numerous other entities. San Francisco voters use ranked-choice voting to elect the mayor, supervisors, and other elective officers.

Mayor

The Mayor of San Francisco is the head of the executive branch of the city and county government. The mayor has the responsibility to enforce all city laws, administer and coordinate city departments and intergovernmental activities, set forth policies and agendas to the Board of Supervisors, and prepare and submit the city budget at the end of each fiscal year. The mayor has the powers to either approve or veto bills passed by the San Francisco Board of Supervisors, participate in meetings of the Board of Supervisors and its committees, appoint a replacement to fill vacancies in all city elected offices until elections, appoint a member of the Board as acting mayor in his/her absence, and to direct personnel in the case of emergency. The mayor serves a four-year term and is limited to two successive terms. If the mayor dies or resigns, the President of the Board of Supervisors assumes the office as acting mayor.  This has occurred twice since the 1970s: Dianne Feinstein became acting mayor after the assassination of George Moscone in 1978, and London Breed became acting mayor following the death of Ed Lee from a heart attack in 2017.

The current mayor  is London Breed.

Board of Supervisors

The legislative body is composed of the 11-member Board of Supervisors which acts as both a board of supervisors and a city council, with "[a]ll rights and powers of a City and County which are not vested in another officer or entity" by the charter. The Board of Supervisors is headed by a president and is responsible for passing laws and budgets. The members of the Board of Supervisors are elected as representatives of specific districts within the city.

Other elected officers

In addition, there are other citywide elected officers of San Francisco:

Departments and agencies

Entities under the authority of the Board of Supervisors include the:

 Assessment Appeals Board
 San Francisco County Transportation Authority
 San Francisco Youth Commission
 Clerk of the Board of Supervisors
 Budget and Legislative Analyst
 Office of Legislative Analyst
 San Francisco Local Agency Formation Commission
 Sunshine Ordinance Task Force

Entities under the authority of the San Francisco County Superior Court include the:

 Adult Probation

Entities under the authority of the City Administrator include the:

Independent and semi-independent entities include the:

Other entities and programs include:

Finance

Taxes
As of November 2021, San Francisco's sales tax rate was 8.625% distributed as follows:

 7.25% – California State Sales Tax
 6.00% – State
 3.9375% – State – General Fund
 0.50% – State – Local Public Safety Fund
 0.50% – State – Local Revenue Fund for local health and social services
 1.0625% – State – Local Revenue Fund (2011)
 1.25% – Uniform Local Tax
 0.25% – Local County – Transportation funds
 1.00% – Local City/County – Operational funds
 1.375% — City/County Local Taxes
 0.50% – AB 1077 (1977) — Bay Area Rapid Transit (BART) District: Bay Area Rapid Transit, San Francisco Municipal Railway, AC Transit
 0.50% – Proposition K (2003) – 2009-2034: San Francisco County Transportation Authority
 0.125% – Measure RR (2020) – 2021-2051: 2020 Peninsula Corridor Joint Powers Board (Caltrain) Retail Transactions and Use Tax
 0.25% – San Francisco County Public Finance Authority —San Francisco Unified School District and City College of San Francisco

Budget

The fiscal year 2007-08 city and county budget is as follows:

Municipal Law

The government of the City and County of San Francisco is defined by the Charter of the City and County of San Francisco, which is similar to the other counties of California. Pursuant to its charter, San Francisco causes to be published several codified version of its ordinances and regulations, the San Francisco Municipal Codes. Every act prohibited or declared unlawful, and every failure to perform an act required, by the ordinances are misdemeanor crimes, unless otherwise specified as infractions.

San Franciscans also make use of direct ballot initiatives to pass legislation.

San Francisco's municipal authority extends beyond city/county limits through its operation of the San Francisco International Airport and the vast tracts of land supporting the Hetch Hetchy Water System.

Health Commission 
The Department of Public Health works through two Divisions of the government - the San Francisco Health Network and Population Health and Prevention. The San Francisco Health Networks includes the health system with locations at multiple hospitals and primary care centers. The Population Health and Prevention Division focuses on the communities in SF and consists of three branches - Community Health and Safety Branch, Community Health Promotion and Prevention Branch, and the Community Health Services Branch. On June 25, 2019, San Francisco become the first major US city to ban Electronic cigarettes.

San Francisco plague of 1900 - 1904 

In the 1890s San Francisco received heavy ship traffic from Asian cities that were currently dealing with the bubonic plague. In 1889, a ship from Hong Kong was found to have two cases of bubonic plague on board. The bodies washed up on the bay later, but no immediate outbreak occurred at this initial finding. In 1900 a city health officer autopsied a Chinese man and found evidence of the plague. With anti-Chinese feelings already running rampant throughout the city, the Department of Public Health quickly moved to quarantine Chinatown. Initially the quarantine was protested, not to protect the Chinese, but because of fear and doubt that the plague was indeed in the city. The mayor at the time, James D. Phelan, created the Board of Health, which included multiple doctors on the board. He demanded the Board of Health have 100 physicians search a 12-block area in Chinatown for more cases of the plague. After victims were found, the Board of Health publicly announced the plague, and the Chinatown quarantine was again set into place.

Health officials shut down Chinese-owned businesses, and any Chinese or Japanese people attempting to leave the city had to first go through an inoculation with an experimental prophylactic developed by Waldemar Haffkine. This led to a court case between Chinatown resident Wong Wai and the Department of Public Health. Wai won the court case and the Department of Public Health was ordered to stop the inoculations, but city officials got support from the Board of Supervisors to continue.  Health authorities also attempted to set up a detention camp for those of Asian descent in Mission Rock, but the idea was protested and canceled, partially due to fear about openly admitting the plague in San Francisco.

Fear of the plague and prejudice against Chinese was so high that many city officials debated burning down Chinatown. The idea popular, especially since this had been done in Honolulu. To prevent their homes from being burnt down and break the quarantine, the Chinese rallied the Chinese Six Companies, multiple attorneys, and China's diplomat. Together, they were ultimately able to get the quarantine lifted again. This was again in part due to the government's fear of publicly confirming plague.

Health authorities from 21 states eventually passed a resolution about California's neglect of duties to address the plague in San Francisco and threatened to close all trade with California. San Francisco businessmen reacted by assembling the Chamber of Commerce, Board of Trade, Merchants’ Association, Marine Hospital Service, new mayor George C. Pardee and various and civil rights groups to clear San Francisco of the plague.

Education
There are several school districts that are co-extensive with San Francisco. The San Francisco Unified School District is governed by the elected seven-member San Francisco Board of Education. The community college district of the City College of San Francisco is governed by an elected seven-member Board of Trustees.

Regional governments

In addition, several regional governmental units in San Francisco operate independently of the municipal government. Five regional agencies—the Association of Bay Area Governments, Metropolitan Transportation Commission, Bay Area Air Quality Management District, San Francisco Bay Regional Water Quality Control Board, and Bay Conservation and Development Commission—have jurisdiction over San Francisco and the other Bay Area counties, and San Francisco appoints representatives to their governing boards.

Several transit agencies provide transit service within San Francisco and adjacent counties, including the Bay Area Rapid Transit (BART), of which residents elect Board of Directors for districts 7, 8, and 9, Golden Gate Transit, Caltrain, the San Francisco Bay Area Water Emergency Transportation Authority, and the Metropolitan Transportation Commission.

State and federal police agencies
Also notable are the independent police forces of the University of California, San Francisco and the Park Police of the Presidio Trust and the Golden Gate National Recreation Area.

Political Parties

Democratic Party 
The San Francisco Democratic Central Committee (SFDCC), the governing body of the San Francisco Democratic Party, is a county central committee of the California Democratic Party for San Francisco. The SFDCC is elected from the two Assembly districts in San Francisco and consists of 24 members, with a 14/10 member split between the two Assembly districts based on number of registered Democrats.

Republican Party 
The San Francisco Republican Executive Committee is the governing party of the San Francisco Republican Party. It is a county committee of the California Republican Party. The executive committee are elected every four years by party delegates from two Assembly districts.

Libertarian Party 
Every member of the Libertarian Party of San Francisco, the county affiliate of the Libertarian Party of California, is automatically a member of the Central Committee. Four officers are elected from this Central Committee.

Green Party 
The San Francisco Green Party, the county affiliate of the Green Party of California, elects a County Council of seven individuals every 2 years.

See also
 Government of California

References

External links

 SFGov.org, official site of City and County of San Francisco
 San Francisco Voter Pamphlets and Propositions dating back to 1907 at the San Francisco Public Library
 San Francisco Charter and Municipal Codes from American Legal Publishing
 San Francisco Decoded (unofficial Charter and Municipal Codes) from the OpenGov Foundation
 San Francisco Data
 

 
San Francisco